Evgeny Serafimovich Lovchev (born 29 January 1949) is a Russian sports journalist, a former footballer, football and futsal manager.

Honours
 Soviet Top League winner: 1969.
 Soviet Top League runner-up: 1974.
 Soviet Top League bronze: 1970.
 Soviet Cup winner: 1971.
 Top 33 players year-end list: 7 times.
 Soviet Footballer of the Year: 1972.

Career
He was capped 52 times for USSR, playing the 1970 FIFA World Cup and the 1972 Summer Olympics. In 1970, he became the first player to be booked on a World Cup match, in the opening game of the tournament against Mexico.

Personal
His son Evgeniy Lovchev played football professionally, including Kazakhstan national football team.

References

External links
Profile

1949 births
Footballers from Moscow
Living people
Russian footballers
Soviet footballers
Soviet Union international footballers
Soviet Top League players
FC Spartak Moscow players
FC Dynamo Moscow players
PFC Krylia Sovetov Samara players
1970 FIFA World Cup players
Footballers at the 1972 Summer Olympics
Olympic footballers of the Soviet Union
Olympic bronze medalists for the Soviet Union
Soviet football managers
Russian football managers
Olympic medalists in football
Medalists at the 1972 Summer Olympics
Russian sports journalists
Association football defenders